
Gmina Krzyż Wielkopolski is an urban-rural gmina (administrative district) in Czarnków-Trzcianka County, Greater Poland Voivodeship, in west-central Poland.

Villages
Apart from the town of Krzyż Wielkopolski, Gmina Krzyż Wielkopolski contains the villages and settlements of Brzegi, Huta Szklana, Kuźnica Żelichowska, Łokacz Mały, Łokacz Wielki, Lubcz Mały, Lubcz Wielki, Nowe Bielice, Pestkownica, Przesieki, Rzeczyn, Wizany, Zacisze and Żelichowo.

Neighbouring gminas
Gmina Krzyż Wielkopolski is bordered by the gminas of Człopa, Dobiegniew, Drawsko, Drezdenko and Wieleń.

References
Polish official population figures 2006

Krzyz Wielkopolski
Czarnków-Trzcianka County